Romualdo Marenco (March 1, 1841 – October 9, 1907) was an Italian composer primarily noted for ballet music. Marenco started his musical career as a violinist in the Doria Theater in Genoa. His first composition was the ballet Garibaldi's Landing in Marsala. He was appointed the orchestral conductor for La Scala in Milan and also directed the ballet company there for seven years. His best-known ballets were written in collaboration with choreographer Luigi Manzotti during that period.

Marenco is best remembered for the ballet Excelsior, composed in 1881. Excelsior is a tribute to the scientific and industrial progress of the 19th century, from the electric light to the telegraph, steam engine, Fréjus Rail Tunnel, and Suez Canal. As such it foreshadows the Futurism movement. In the first nine months, it was staged 100 times in Italy and abroad. It is still performed and was recently (2002) staged in Milan.

Works
 (1870).

Opera
 Lorenzino de' Medici (Libretto by  G. Perosio, Lodi 1874)
 I Moncalda  (Libretto by Fulgi, Milan 1880)
 Federico Struensée (Novi Ligure 1908)

Operetta

 Le Diable au corps (Libr. E. Blum and P. Toché, Paris 1884)
 Strategia d'amore (Libr. C. A. Blengi, Milan 1896)

Ballet

 Garibaldi's Landing in Marsala (choreog. Pretesi, Milan 1868)
 Amore e Arte (Milan, La Scala 1869)
 Bianca di Nevers (Milan, La Scala 1872)
 The Seven Deadly Sins (Milan, La Scala 1873)
 Tempatation (retitled: Ermanzia, Milan, La Scala 1874)
 Sieba (Turin, 1878)
 Delial ( Milan, La Scala 1880)
 Excelsior (Milan, La Scala 1881)
 Dai Natha (Milan, La Scala 1882)
 L'astro di Afgan (Milan, La Scala 1883)
 Amor (Milan, La Scala 1886)
 Hannibal (Milan, Teatro Dal Verme 1888)
 Teadora (Milan, La Scala 1889)
 Day-Sin (Milan, La Scala 1891)
 Sport (Milan, La Scala 1897)
 Eureka (Milan, La Scala 1901)
 Bacco and Gambrinus (Milan, La Scala 1904)
 Light (Milan, La Scala 1905)

Other works 

 Two symphonies
 Inaugural March for the Turin Exposition
 Bella Elvezia, polka for pianoforte
 Hymn to Ticino (Lugano 1899)

References 
Notes

Sources
 Bussi, Francesco (2001). "Marenco, Romualdo" in Sadie 2001.
 Sadie, Stanley, editor; John Tyrell; executive editor (2001). The New Grove Dictionary of Music and Musicians, 2nd edition. London: Macmillan.  (hardcover).  (eBook).

External links
 

Italian ballet composers
Italian opera composers
Male opera composers
1841 births
1907 deaths
Italian male classical composers
Italian classical composers
19th-century Italian musicians
19th-century Italian male musicians